Dhami is an Indian surname. Some famous people with the surname "Dhami":

Narinder Dhami (born 1958), British children's author 
Hartinder Dhami, British-Indian Bhangra artist
Jaz Dhami, Punjabi singer
Prem Singh Dhami, Nepalese politician and minister
Pushkar Singh Dhami, Indian politician and the current Chief Minister of Uttarakhand
Harish Singh Dhami, Indian politician from Uttarakhand
Drashti Dhami, Indian TV actress

See also
Dhami (disambiguation)